Sean Anthony Hjelle (born May 7, 1997) is an American professional baseball pitcher for the San Francisco Giants of Major League Baseball (MLB). He played college baseball for the University of Kentucky. The Giants selected Hjelle in the second round of the 2018 Major League Baseball draft. Hjelle and former pitcher Jon Rauch are the tallest major leaguers ever.

Amateur career
Hjelle attended Mahtomedi High School in Mahtomedi, Minnesota, where he played baseball and basketball. In baseball as a pitcher, he threw a two-seam fastball, a four-seam fastball, a changeup, and a cutter. Hjelle was not drafted out of high school, and enrolled at the University of Kentucky to play college baseball for the Kentucky Wildcats.

In 2017, as a sophomore at Kentucky, Hjelle was named the Southeastern Conference's Pitcher of the Year after going 9–2 with a 3.17 earned run average (ERA) in the regular season, including a 7–1 record and a 1.90 ERA in SEC games. As a junior in 2018, he appeared in 15 games (14 starts), compiling a 7–5 record with a 3.44 ERA.

Professional career
The San Francisco Giants selected Hjelle in the second round, with the 45th overall selection, of the 2018 MLB draft. He signed for a $1.5 million signing bonus and made his professional debut with the Salem-Keizer Volcanoes. Hjelle spent the whole season with Salem-Keizer, compiling a 5.06 ERA in 12 starts.

Hjelle began the 2019 season with the Augusta GreenJackets of the Class A South Atlantic League, and was their Opening Day starter. He was promoted to the Class A-Advanced San Jose Giants in May. In August, the Giants promoted Hjelle to the Richmond Flying Squirrels of the Class AA Eastern League, with whom he finished the year. Over 28 starts between the three clubs, Hjelle went 7–9 with a 3.32 ERA.

In 2021, Hjelle pitched for the Sacramento River Cats of the Class AAA Pacific Coast League. After the season, the Giants added Hjelle to their 40-man roster. He started the 2022 season with Sacramento and made his MLB debut on May 6.

In 2022 with AAA Sacramento, he was 6-8 with a 4.92 ERA in 22 starts, in which he pitched 97 innings. With the Giants in 2022 he was 1-2 with a 5.76 ERA in eight relief appearances, covering 25 innings in which he struck out 28 batters.

Personal life
Hjelle and his wife Caroline have two children.  His name is pronounced "Jelly".

References

External links

1997 births
Living people
People from Mahtomedi, Minnesota
Baseball players from Minnesota
Major League Baseball pitchers
San Francisco Giants players
Kentucky Wildcats baseball players
Salem-Keizer Volcanoes players
Augusta GreenJackets players
San Jose Giants players
Richmond Flying Squirrels players
Sacramento River Cats players
Mat-Su Miners players